S Make It (slang for 'Let's go') is a recording by the hard bop Art Blakey jazz ensemble. It was recorded in Los Angeles in 1964 and issued on the Limelight label. Following the departure of stars from his 1961 to 1964 band, Freddie Hubbard, Wayne Shorter and Cedar Walton, it includes previous Blakey alumni and newer players. This was trombonist Curtis Fuller's last recording as a regular member of the group, though he would return to record sporadically with Blakey in the 1970s and 80s.  The album was re-released on Verve in 2004.

Reception

Jeffery S. McMillan has called the release one of Blakey's most underrated works and that it exemplifies his 1964–1965 work. In a review in the December 1965 issue of Black World, the title track is described as "a diabolical concept, a dark image, invoking the innermost caverns of Manhattan." David Rickert calls the album "a fine Messengers album and a good example of the drummer's consistently satisfying work." Russ Musto referred to the release as a "return to a more soulful sound". Ken Dryden stated in his Allmusic review that "It's a shame that this was the only recording by this particular lineup of the Jazz Messengers, as [John] Gilmore's strong blowing complements Morgan very well".

Track listing

Personnel

Musicians
Art Blakey – drums
Lee Morgan – trumpet
Curtis Fuller – trombone
John Gilmore – tenor sax
John Hicks – piano
Victor Sproles – bass

Production
Jack Tracy – producer
Ken Druker – executive producer
Pete Romano – engineer
Dave Wiechman – engineer
Kip Smith – mixing
Leonard Feather – liner notes
Don Bronstein – cover photo

References 

Art Blakey albums
The Jazz Messengers albums
1965 albums